Michelangelo Leonardi is a former Italian racing driver. He entered one race in 1939 in an Alfa Romeo and eight races in the mid-1950s in a Lancia Aurelia and a Ferrari-Abarth 166 MM/53.

Complete results

References

Mille Miglia drivers
Italian racing drivers
Living people
Year of birth missing (living people)
Place of birth missing (living people)